Manuela Vali Hoelterhoff is a German-born American cultural journalist, who was the executive editor of Muse, the arts and culture section of Bloomberg News until 2015. She is a Pulitzer Prize for Criticism laureate.

Personal life and education
Manuela V. Hoelterhoff was born April 6, 1949 in Hamburg, Germany to a Latvian mother, Olga Christina Alexandrovna Goertz, a native of Riga, and a German father, Heinz Alfons Martin Hoelterhoff.
	
She immigrated to the United States with her parents in 1957.  Hoelterhoff holds a bachelor's degree from Hofstra University, and a master's degree from the Institute of Fine Arts of New York University.

Professional career
Hoelterhoff is a commentator and editor whose topics have ranged widely over the contemporary world to include opera and theater, art and architecture, literature and travel, and how animals affect our lives. Her first articles appeared in William F. Buckley's National Review. There followed a twenty-year stint at The Wall Street Journal, where she wrote reviews and served as arts editor, books editor and member of the editorial board.  In this period, she was also a founding editor of SmartMoney magazine, and worked with Harold Evans on creating Conde Nast Traveler.

Hoelterhoff won the annual Pulitzer Prize for Criticism for her 1982 work with The Wall Street Journal, citing "her wide-ranging criticism on the arts and other subjects".

In 1998, Alfred A. Knopf published her Cinderella & Company: Backstage at the Opera with Cecilia Bartoli, which was widely reviewed. It was translated into French, German and Dutch and it received positive reviews.

In 2000 she was named a Guggenheim Fellow to research Hitler's opera obsessions.

In 2004, Hoelterhoff was hired by Matt Winkler to create a cultural section for Bloomberg News, the company's financial news service. Muse publishes daily on all the arts  – from the visual and performing arts to the literary and culinary, plus movies, TV, the art market, cars, gadgets, the environment, travel, and animals.

References

External links
 

Pulitzer Prize for Criticism winners
The Wall Street Journal people
German emigrants to the United States
American people of Latvian descent
Hofstra University alumni
New York University alumni
Living people
1949 births
American women journalists
American women critics
American opera librettists
Women opera librettists
21st-century American women